Atanase Sciotnic (1 March 1942 – 5 April 2017) was a Romanian sprint canoeist. He took part in the two-man and four man events at most major competitions between 1963 and 1974 and won two Olympic and nine world championships medals, including four gold medals.

References

External links 
 
 
 

1942 births
2017 deaths
Canoeists at the 1964 Summer Olympics
Canoeists at the 1968 Summer Olympics
Canoeists at the 1972 Summer Olympics
Olympic canoeists of Romania
Olympic silver medalists for Romania
Olympic bronze medalists for Romania
Romanian male canoeists
Romanian people of Russian descent
Olympic medalists in canoeing
ICF Canoe Sprint World Championships medalists in kayak
Medalists at the 1972 Summer Olympics
Medalists at the 1964 Summer Olympics
People from Tulcea County